The Bunnaloo Football Club was an Australian rules football club based in the town of Bunnaloo, New South Wales, which first formed in 1927, before disbanding in the 1929. The team reformed in 1952 to join the newly created Echuca Football League, before folding at the end of the 1989 season.

History

The formation of the Bunnaloo Football Club was first announced when an advertisement appeared in the Riverine Herald (the local Echuca newspaper) asked from umpires for the soon-to-be-formed W F Association, a football league. In 1927, the Wakool Walliston Bunnaloo Football Association was formed featuring four teams: Wakool, Walliston, Bunnaloo and Caldwell. This was Bunnaloo's first football team, with J Keech acting as captain. In 1929 the league was renamed the Womboota and District Football League, with Womboota replacing the team from Walliston. Bunnaloo finished the season in first place, but lost the premiership to Wakool.

At the closure of the 1929 season, the league was disbanded. The Bunnaloo Football club played next in 1933, in two games against Caldwell, the first home and the second away. Bunnaloo won the home match on 8 July, with the away game played in Caldwell two weeks later. The Bunnaloo Football Club was not active again until 1945, when it played a series of matches against Womboota. The team, captained by Arthur Tomlinson, won two and lost two of the four matches.

In 1951 the planned Echuca Football League was announced, with Bunnaloo featured in the original line-up. When it formed in 1952, the Bunnaloo club was reformed and joined the league with teams from Mathoura, Moama, Bamawm Extension, Bamawm and Rochester East. The club remained in this league for the remainder of its existence. In 1988 and 1989 Bunnaloo won back-to-back premierships, and following the 1989 premiership was forced to cease existence. 1990 marked the closure of the Echuca Football League and the formation of the Murray Football League. Bunnaloo was unable to find enough players to field a team.

Premierships

Honour Board

Echuca Football League Best and Fairest
Leigh White (1965)

See also
 Bunnaloo, New South Wales
 Bunnaloo Public School

References

1927 establishments in Australia
1989 disestablishments in Australia
Australian rules football clubs in New South Wales
Australian rules football clubs established in 1927
Australian rules football clubs disestablished in 1989